Calystegia marginata is a species of morning glory, found in eastern Australia and New Zealand. A hairless and vigorous perennial climbing plant, with twining stems. The habitat is moist gullies in sclerophyll forest and on rainforest margins, widespread on the coast and ranges of eastern Australia.This is one of the many plants first published by Robert Brown with the type known as "(J.) v.v." appearing in his Prodromus Florae Novae Hollandiae et Insulae Van Diemen in 1810. The specific epithet marginata is derived from Latin, probably referring to the habitat being the margins of rainforests.

References

Calystegia
Plants described in 1810
Flora of New South Wales
Flora of Queensland
Flora of Victoria (Australia)
Flora of New Zealand
Taxa named by Robert Brown (botanist, born 1773)